Steffen Janich (born January 22, 1971) is a German politician for Alternative for Germany (AfD). He has been a member of the German Bundestag since 2021 and represents the constituency of Sächsische Schweiz-Osterzgebirge.

Janich graduated from the Johann Wolfgang Goethe Polytechnic in Pirna and became a police officer. He was a member of the Christian Democratic Union (CDU) until 2013 after which he joined the newly formed AfD. In the 2021 German federal election, he ran both as a list candidate in Saxony and as a direct candidate for the constituency of Sächsische Schweiz-Osterzgebirge, which had previously been represented by former AfD leader Frauke Petry. With a 33% share of the vote and a 13.8% lead over Corinna Franke-Wöller (CDU), the wife of Saxony Interior Minister Roland Wöller, he won the direct mandate as a member of the German Bundestag.

References 

Living people
1971 births
Christian Democratic Union of Germany politicians
Members of the Bundestag for Saxony
Members of the Bundestag for the Alternative for Germany
Members of the Bundestag 2021–2025
People from Pirna